The 2003 K2 League was the first season of the Korea National League. It was divided into two stages, and the winners of each stage qualified for the championship playoff.

Regular season

First stage

Second stage

Championship playoff

Summary

Results

Goyang Kookmin Bank won 5–4 on aggregate.

See also
 2003 in South Korean football
 2003 Korean FA Cup

References

External links

Korea National League seasons
K